Benito Juárez Municipality may refer to one of several Mexican municipalities:

Benito Juárez Municipality, Guerrero
Benito Juárez Municipality, Quintana Roo
Benito Juárez Municipality, Sonora
Benito Juárez Municipality, Tlaxcala
Benito Juárez Municipality, Veracruz
Benito Juárez Municipality, Zacatecas

See also
Juárez Municipality (disambiguation)

Municipality name disambiguation pages